St. Philip's Episcopal Church, or variants thereof, may refer to the following:

United States
 St. Philip's Episcopal Church (Wrangell, Alaska), listed on the National Register of Historic Places (NRHP) in Alaska
 St. Philip's in the Hills Episcopal Church, Tucson, Arizona, listed on the NRHP in Pima County
 St. Philip's Episcopal Church (Harrodsburg, Kentucky), listed on the NRHP in Mercer County
 St. Philip's Episcopal Church (Boyce, Louisiana), listed on the NRHP in Rapides Parish
 St. Philip's Episcopal Church (Trenton, Missouri), listed on the NRHP in Grundy County
 St. Philip's Episcopal Church (Rosebud, Montana), listed on the NRHP in Rosebud County
 St. Philip's Episcopal Church (Manhattan), New York, listed on the NRHP in Manhattan
 St. Philip's Episcopal Church (Brevard, North Carolina), listed on the NRHP in Transylvania County
 St. Philip's Church, Brunswick Town, North Carolina, listed on the NRHP in Brunswick County
 St. Philip's Episcopal Church (Germanton, North Carolina), listed on the NRHP in Stokes County
 St. Philip's Episcopal Church (Circleville, Ohio), listed on the NRHP in Pickaway County
 St. Philip's Episcopal Church (Bradford Springs, South Carolina), listed on the NRHP in Lee County
 St. Philip's Episcopal Church (Charleston, South Carolina), listed on the NRHP in Charleston County